Michaela Daamen is a paralympic athlete from Germany competing mainly in category F44 shot and discus events.

Michaela has twice competed in the paralympics in 2000 and in 2004.  On both occasions she competed in the shot and discus and it was in 2000 that she won her only medal a gold in the F44 shot put.

References

Paralympic athletes of Germany
Athletes (track and field) at the 2000 Summer Paralympics
Athletes (track and field) at the 2004 Summer Paralympics
Paralympic gold medalists for Germany
Living people
World record holders in Paralympic athletics
Medalists at the 2000 Summer Paralympics
Year of birth missing (living people)
Paralympic medalists in athletics (track and field)
German female shot putters
20th-century German women
21st-century German women
Shot putters with limb difference
Paralympic shot putters